Lake Catherine State Park is a  public recreation area located on the south shore of Lake Catherine,  southeast of Hot Springs, Arkansas. The park was built in the 1930s by the Civilian Conservation Corps. Three stone-and-wood cabins, a former concessions building, and a bridge constructed in the Corps' rustic architecture style are listed on the National Register of Historic Places.

Activities and amenities
Park amenities include a visitors center, cabins and campsites, marina with boat rentals, horseback riding stable, picnicking and swimming areas, and ten miles of hiking trails.

References

External links
 Lake Catherine State Park Arkansas State Parks

State parks of Arkansas
Protected areas of Hot Spring County, Arkansas
Protected areas established in 1935
1935 establishments in Arkansas
Civilian Conservation Corps in Arkansas